Eupholus magnificus is a species of beetle belonging to the  family Curculionidae.

Description
The elytra show transversal black, blue and green bands. The blue and green colours derives from very small scales. The pronotum and the legs are metallic blue. The top of the rostrum and the end of the antennae are black.

Distribution
This species can be found in New Guinea.

References

 Universal Biological Indexer
 Eupholus magnificus

Entiminae
Beetles described in 1877